The Israel national netball team participates in International tournaments, representing the country of Israel. They are part of Netball Europe and are a full member of the International Netball Federation (INF). They are also associate members of FENA (Federation of European Netball Associations).

Competitive record
The Israel netball team has participated in a range of international tournaments:

 Maccabi International, London 2003
 17th Maccabi Games, 2005
 18th Maccabi Games, 2009
 19th Maccabi Games, 2013
 European Development Tournament, Wales 2006
 World Youth Netball Championships, Glasgow 2013
 European Festival, Gibraltar 2012
 European Festival, Malta 2010
 European Festival, Ireland 2008

Results at the World Youth Netball Championships, Glasgow 2013:

 23 August – Australia 123 beat Israel 6
 25 August – South Africa 134 beat Israel 4
 26 August – Fiji 82 beat Israel 20
 27 August – Namibia 98 beat Israel 9
 28 August – Malta 69 beat Israel 28
 29 August – Cayman Islands 71 beat Israel 26
 30 August – Ireland 47 beat Israel 37

In 2010, a domestic netball league was formed consisting of five teams:

 Tel Aviv
 Jerusalem-Ma’ale Adumim
 Modi'in
 Ra’anana
 Jerusalem Mercaz

Other teams have since joined the league, including Katamon and Jtown. The Yonathan School Sports Hall in Ra’anana was the venue of the final game in the first domestic netball league in Israel. Jodi Saitowitz Carreira is the secretary and founder of Israel netball. In the 2014/2015 season, all leagues games were held in "the new sports centre", in the city of Modi'in Maccabim Reut.  In 2016, the national team participated in the Challenge Cup of the Open Championships in England with a strong squad featuring tournament MVP Nomi Komar and her sister Chani Nomar.

See also
 Sport in Israel
 Netball
 Women's sports

References

Organizations with year of establishment missing
National netball teams of Europe
National netball team
Women's national sports teams of Israel